In enzymology, a D-lactate dehydrogenase (cytochrome c-553) is an enzyme that catalyzes the chemical reaction

(R)-lactate + 2 ferricytochrome c-553  pyruvate + 2 ferrocytochrome c-553

Thus, the two substrates of this enzyme are (R)-lactate and ferricytochrome c-553, whereas its two products are pyruvate and ferrocytochrome c-553.

This enzyme belongs to the family of oxidoreductases, to be specific those acting on the CH-OH group of donor with a cytochrome as acceptor. The systematic name of this enzyme class is (R)-lactate:ferricytochrome-c-553 2-oxidoreductase. This enzyme participates in pyruvate metabolism.

References

 

EC 1.1.2
Enzymes of unknown structure